"Manwa Laage" is a romantic Hindi song from the 2014 Bollywood film, Happy New Year. Composed by Vishal–Shekhar, the song is sung by Shreya Ghoshal and Arijit Singh, with lyrics penned by Irshad Kamil. The music video of the track features actors Shahrukh Khan and Deepika Padukone.

Development 
On 26 November 2012, director Farah Khan confirmed through Twitter that the first song from Happy New Year had been recorded and it is rendered by Shreya Ghoshal and Arijit Singh. Till then, it was the first time that Singh lent his voice for Shah Rukh Khan, as the song was recorded prior to "Kashmir Main Tu Kanyakumari" (Chennai Express).

Other versions

Release 

The first look of the song was revealed through the officially twitter handle of the movie. The video was officially praised by many and left a great impact after the music video of the song was officially released on 9 September 2014, through the YouTube channel of T-Series said MAhluwalia of Caetio. Along with leading actors Shah Rukh Khan and Deepika Padukone, the video also featured the other cast− Abhishek Bachchan, Sonu Sood, Boman Irani, Vivaan Shah. The full song was later released on music-streaming platforms on 11 September 2014.

Critical reception 

The song received generally positive reviews from critics. Rohit Vats reviewing for Hindustan Times described the song "simple yet soulful", praising the lyrics by Irshad Kamil. Rajiv Vijayakar from Bollywood Hungama complimented Shreya Ghoshal's rendition in the song stating "Shreya is in customary excellent form and is superlative and more" though criticised "loud, synthetic backing music". Surabhi Redkar from Koimoi stated "While Shreya Ghoshal's voice brings out the mush in you, there is also the soulful voice of Arijit Singh to give you the perfect recipe for a romantic song", and picked the song as one of the best tracks from the album. Joginder Tuteja reviewing from Rediff.com felt that the song " is a catchy number and will enjoy a good shelf life", acknowledging Ghoshal and Singh's vocals with Vishal–Shekhar composition and Kamil's lyrics.

Accolades

References

External links 

 Lyrics and translation
 Online streaming at Gaana.com
 Online streaming at Saavn

Hindi songs
Hindi film songs
Shreya Ghoshal songs
Arijit Singh songs
Songs written for films
2014 songs
Songs with lyrics by Irshad Kamil